Falls of the Neuse Manufacturing Company, also known as the Manteo Manufacturing Company and Forest Manufacturing Company, is a historic paper mill complex located at Falls, Wake County, North Carolina.  The main mill building was built from1854–1855, and is a three-story, quarried granite block building measuring 195 feet long and 54 feet wide.  Located on the property is the stone mill dam, measuring about 400 feet wide and roughly 6 feet tall, and the one-story picker room, measuring 53 feet square. The mill operated as a paper mill until 1896, and later housed a cotton mill and warehouse.

It was listed on the National Register of Historic Places in 1983.

References

External links

Pulp and paper mills in the United States
Cotton mills in the United States
Historic American Engineering Record in North Carolina
Industrial buildings and structures on the National Register of Historic Places in North Carolina
Industrial buildings completed in 1855
Buildings and structures in Wake County, North Carolina
National Register of Historic Places in Wake County, North Carolina
1855 establishments in North Carolina